Greenan Castle is a 16th-century ruined tower house, around  southwest of Ayr in South Ayrshire, Scotland. Situated at the top of a sea cliff, it was originally a promontory fort converted into a motte-and-bailey in the 12th century. In the 15th century a tower house was built by the Lords of the Isles, which later passed into the hands of the Kennedy family.

History 
The lands of Greenan were forfeited by John, Earl of Ross and Lord of the Isles in 1476 for treason against James III. In 1493 James IV granted the Lands of Greenan to William Douglas, son of Archibald, Earl of Angus.

It is not known how long this settlement was occupied, but the site was re-used in the twelfth century.

Beside the tower are traces of a walled courtyard and outbuildings—probably stables and a kitchen block, as the small tower has no kitchen within its walls. In this courtyard on the morning of 12 May 1602, Sir Thomas Kennedy of Culzean and his servant, Lancelot Kennedy, mounted their horses to ride to Edinburgh, having spent the night before with Thomas's half-brother, John Kennedy of Baltersan. Just a few miles away in the woods of St Leonards (now a suburb of Ayr), they were ambushed by Thomas Kennedy (of Drummurchie), Thomas Kennedy (brother to the Laird of Bargany), Walter Muir of Cloncaird, Thomas M'Alexander, Thomas Wallace, a boy called Gilbert Ramsay and a borderer, Williame Irrwing. Sir Thomas was murdered in retaliation for the death of the young Laird of Bargany in December, 1601 at the Battle of Brockloch, near Maybole. Years later, the Muirs of Auchindrain (father and son) were executed for their "art and part" in this murder. The story inspired Sir Walter Scott to write a short play, "An Ayrshire Tragedy".

The castle passed through various members of the clan before ending up in the hands of Thomas Kennedy, Earl of Cassillis in 1766. Around this time the residential use of the castle seems to have stopped; today the structure is a ruin

Notable features

The entrance lintel has the inscription, JK 1603 FMD, for John Kennedy of Baltersan and his third wife, Florence MacDowell, who held the lands, Greenan Mill, and salmon fishing rights on the River Doon at that time.

See also
Alloway Mote

References

Further reading

External links 
Video with commentary and annotation on the history of Greenan Castle
 

Castles in South Ayrshire
Category B listed buildings in South Ayrshire
Listed castles in Scotland
Tower houses in Scotland